Islam in Vietnam is primarily the religion of the Cham people, an Austronesian minority ethnic group; however, roughly one-third of Muslims in Vietnam are of other ethnic groups. There is also a community, who describes itself of mixed ethnic origins (Cham, Khmer, Malay, Minang, Viet, Chinese and Arab), that practices Islam and are also known as Cham, or Cham Muslims, around the region of Châu Đốc in the Southwest.

History

Spread of Islam (750–1400)

Uthman ibn Affan, the third Caliph of Islam, sent the first official Muslim envoy to Vietnam and Tang Dynasty China in 650. Seafaring Muslim traders are known to have made stops at ports in the Champa Kingdom en route to China very early in the history of Islam. During the 9th and 12th century, various medieval Arabic geographical works had identified modern-day eastern Indochina as lands of the Qimar (Khmer, Cambodians), the Sanf (Cham) and the Luqin (Vietnamese). Arab Muslim merchamnts reached Luqin (Hanoi) while Vietnam was under Tang China's rule. Luqin (Hanoi in north Vietnam) was home to one of the biggest Muslim foreign quarters when Vietnam was ruled by Tang China.

However, the earliest material evidence of the transmission of Islam consists of Song Dynasty-era documents from China, which record that the Cham familiarized themselves with Islam in the late 10th and early 11th centuries. Following the usurpation of Lưu Kế Tông (r. 986–989), many Chams and Muslims sought refuge in China. The Song dynastic records state that in 986, hundreds of people from Champa, having been led by Pu Bo E (Abu Nurs), arrived at Hainan. In the next two years, nearly 500 refugees from Champa arrived at Canton headed by Li Ning Bian and Hu Xuan (Hussain), who "demanded the protection of China". 

At the same time, during the Mongol invasions of Vietnam, several Mongol generals were Muslims, including Omar Nasr al-Din, and the major bulk of Mongol army invading Đại Việt and Champa came from the Turks and Persians. During their short conquest, the Mongols managed to spread Islam, although it was never large enough to challenge the Vietnamese. During a visit to Champa in 1340s, Ibn Battuta described a princess who met him, spoke in Turkish, was literate in Arabic, and wrote out the bismillah in the presence of the visitor. However, Ibn Battuta did not consider Champa an Islamic state. The number of followers began to increase as contacts with Sultanate of Malacca broadened in the wake of the 1471 collapse of the Champa Kingdom, but Islam would not become widespread among the Cham until the mid-17th century.

Origin of Islam in Champa

Origin of Shiite Bani
Islam first appears in early Cham texts as Asulam, as the Cham people are still referring it today. Bani Awal (Bini ralaoh, people of Allah) religion, a syncretic, localized version Shi'a Islam, gained dominance in 17th century Panduranga. The unspecified origin of Bani as well as the coming of Islam to Champa are still contested by researchers which need to interpret several sources and Cham folktales, and try to reconstruct the history of Islam in Champa for that matter. Scholars like Antoine Cabaton and Pierre-Yves Manguin proposed two preliminary theories for the apostle of Islam to Champa: The first theory states that Islam could have been introduced by Arab, Persian, Indian merchants, scholars, religious leaders, during from the 10th to 14th century. This periodization makes some efficient sense because Champa has been well known by Middle East literature since the early medieval era, and the presence of Muslim communities in Champa is also attested by archaeology, medieval Perso-Arabic and Chinese geography texts.

For example, Al-Dimashqi claimed a story that the Alīds after being expelled, a small portion of them took refugee in Champa; these Muslim immigrants thereby spread Shi'a among the Cham, which perhaps eventually led to the synthesis of the Bani Awal religion. Two Kufic gravestones found in Phan Rang dating from 1038-39 of a Arab Muslim merchant named Abu Kamil who originated from Egypt indicate a certain sort of reiterated autonomy of a mercantile Muslim community in the city-state of Panduranga, which was granted by a Cham king who understood their importance in commerce and tertiary. The Cham Bani has been suggested to be religious adherents of Isma'ili sect of Shi'a traders in medieval Champa. The legendary king of Panduranga Po Ovlvah who reigned from 1000 to 1036 in the Cham annals, whoes his name is believed to be Cham rendition of Allah. 

The popular accounts mainly outside of Champa, from the Cham diasporas, assure that the Cham had been converted by either ʿAlī and his son Muḥammad ibn al-Ḥanafīyya. A comparative oral tradition from the Cambodian Cham communities also states "Lord ʿAlī had sent Muḥammad ibn al-Ḥanafīyya to Champa to teach Islam." Several related Cham tales such as Po Rasulak, Po Ali, and Po (Fāṭima) Phwatima seemingly narrate the connection between early medieval Champa and the Islamic world. These are testified in Cham Bani wedding ceremonies, in which the bride and groom's ceremonial names are the Cham representations of ʿAlī and Fāṭima. For instance, a Cham man in Kampong Cham province born in 1885 told that his genealogy was begun with Sayyid Mustafa, claimed to be a descendant of ʿAlī. Sayyid Mustafa went to Phan Rang and taught Islam while learning Akhar Thar Cham script, then walked to Cambodia and taught Islam to the Cambodian Cham.

However according to most historians, plausibly, the Cham only began converting to Islam en masse after the fall of Vijaya in 1471.

Contradictory narrative and Malay origin of Cham Islam
The second theory argues that Islam arrived in Champa through a later, shorter, indirectly way from the Malays (jawa, melayu, chvea), is considered more convincing and valid. After the fall of Vijaya in 1471 to the 17th century during the Age of Exploration, global trade in early modern Southeast Asia experienced a booming upward trajectory. Anthony Reid explains that at the same time, the Portuguese and Spanish Christians had arrived in the region and carried out ambitious colonial conquests and trade dominance, provoking political associations among the Southeast Asian Muslims. Among them were the Cham diaspora of merchants, warriors, and refugees whom had adopted Islamic faiths from the Malays through peaceful correlation were operating commercial activities throughout Southeast Asia, and built a strong relationship with them. Those Cham Muslims then returned to their homeland and started preaching Islam to their fellow people by the 1500s. 

Contacts between Islamic sultanates on the Indonesian Archipelago with Champa (Panduranga) increased during 15th and 16th century. Cham texts relate the introduction of Islam into Champa began with a princess of Makkah and two Malay princes from Kelantan who came to Champa to promote the messages of the Qur'an. When the princess returns to her homeland, her Cham lover feels unable to abandon his ancestors' religion and adopt Islam, so the second tale tells that the Cham king Po Rome (r. 1627–51) conceived hybridization according to Cham customary to ensure interreligious harmony in Cham society upon the advice of the Malay princes. The Malay Sejarah Melayu (Malay Annals) made a reverse claim: the Cham are credited for the introduction and promotion of Islam to Java. In conclusion, Manguin attributes the Islamization of the Cham people to their active participation the regional maritime networks, and the Malay states and Malay traders which also had contributed great impacts to the process.

Flourishing period (1400–1800)

A Spanish record in late 1580s reported that "many Muslims live in Champa, whose Hindu king wanted Islam to be spoken and taught, resulted in many mosques existed along with Hindu temples". Many Cham Qur'an manuscripts and Bani legends were written during this period in Panduranga, for examples several Bani legends, the first relating to Fāṭima, daughter of the Prophet, and this is followed by an explanation of the origin of mosques, created by the Prophet Muhammad, ʿAlī, and the archangel Gabriel.

To resolve growing hatreds between the Balamon and the Bani Awal, King Po Rome ordered the Cham Bani to have their religion more integrated with Cham customs and beliefs, while pressing the Ahier to accept Allah as the most supreme God but allowed them to retain their worships of traditional Cham divinities, excellently reforging peace and cohesion in his kingdom. Thus preserved the pre-Islamic Cham identity while entangling and incorporating Islam into basis of Cham culture. King Po Rome is an important deity that is being venerated by the Cham people today. Connections between Pandaranga and the extra Malay/Islamic world blossomed. Syncretism was widely practiced at all levels, best known for incorporating cosmopolitan Islamic doctrines into existing indigenous Cham beliefs and Hindu pantheons. The Cham Bani developed a distinct Islamic literature, with beckoned combination of more or less Arabic passages, including Islamic heroes and prophecies, cosmology, Islamization legends, Quranic verses, royal chronicles and genealogies, and Malay-Cham wordlists. The multipurpose lunisolar sakawi calendar, was likely Po Rome's best combination of previous Cham Śaka era with the Islamic lunar calendar.

The Cham Bani blended Shi'a teachings and traditions with their own traditional Cham customs, such as keeping old Sanskrit titles among the clergy; the Ramadhan (Ramawan) month was reduced to three-day-fest instead of whole month; daily praying time was four hours and the last hour at night was skipped. Despite that, Bani Awal follows strict monotheism; Awal imam (acar) must perform praying (saemiang), rituals, and ordination only inside the mosque (magik, masjid). Cham Bani do not accept the worship altar of dead ancestors, nor deceased father and mother being placed inside the house. Names of deceased persons are forbidden to call directly. Instead, the Bani would remember them by calling slant names. The Bani would refurbish their ancestors cemetery steles and have a remembrance ceremony to pay respect and filial piety to ancestors every year on the Gabur Rak day, usually takes place at the end of the Šaʿbān (Shaban) month.

European missionaries described Champa in the 1670s as having the majority of its population being Muslims, a Muslim sultan, and a Muslim court. In 1680 Panduranga king Po Saut (r. 1659–1692) styled himself with Malay horrific Paduka Seri Sultan in his hand letter to the Dutch in Java.

The Nguyen invaded Panduranga in 1690s and locked the Cham polity in completed isolation, which resulted in the disconnection between the Cham and the Malay-Islamic world. By the early 1800s, the majority of Cham Muslims in Old Champa (Central Vietnam) were practicing Bani Shiism, still using the traditional Akhar Thrah Cham script. Meanwhile, the majority of Cambodian and Mekong Delta Chams became orthodox Sunni Muslims and adopted Arabic-derived Jawi script.

Persecution under Minh Mang
In 1832, the Vietnamese Emperor Minh Mạng annexed the last Champa Kingdom. Minh Mang outlawed Cham religions, both Bani and Balamon. Mosques were razed to the ground. The Ramawan was forbidden. This resulted in the Cham Muslim leader Katip Sumat, who was educated in Kelantan, declaring a Jihad against the Vietnamese. The Vietnamese coercively fed lizard and pig meat to Cham Muslims and cow meat to Cham Hindus against their will to punish them and assimilate them to Vietnamese culture.

In the mid-19th century, many Cham Muslims emigrated from Cambodia and settled in the Mekong Delta region, further bolstering the presence of Islam in Vietnam. Between 1885 and 1890, Hanoi's only mosque, the Al-Noor Mosque on Hang Luoc Street, was built using contributions from the local Indian community. Malayan Islam began to have increasing influence on the Chams in the early 20th century. Religious publications were imported from Malaya; Malay clerics gave khutba (sermons) in mosques in the Malay language; and some Cham people went to Malayan madrasah to further their studies of Islam. The Mekong Delta also saw the arrival of Malay Muslims.

Post-independence (since 1945)
As the Saigon (Republic of Vietnam, RVN) government seized minority lands for Northern Kinh refugees in the 1950s, nationalist sentiment among the Cham and indigenous peoples increased. Cham Muslims and Hindus formed the Cham Liberation Front (Front de Liberation du Champa, FLC) led by the Muslim Lieutenant-Colonel Les Kosem to fight against both North and South Vietnam during the Vietnam War in order to obtain Cham independence. The Cham Liberation Front joined with the Montagnards and Khmer Krom to form the United Front for the Liberation of Oppressed Races (Front Uni de Lutte des Races Opprimées, FULRO) to fight the Vietnamese.

During the 1960s and prior to 1975, a series of tensions and violent clashes between the Bani Awal and Cham Sunni broke out in Ninh Thuan and Binh Thuan. The problems were due to efforts of Cham Sunni to promote the more orthodox variety of Islam among the Bani, who they regarded for not having upheld the true teachings of the Quran. The most notable and active organization for the efforts was the Hiệp hội Chàm Hồi giáo Việt Nam (Cham Muslim Association of Vietnam). One key component of the Association was expanding ties between Cham Muslim communities with other Islamic countries, especially Malaysia, causing the new Socialist Republic of Vietnam's government reacted with cautious. Even when Vietnam rejoined Malaysia and Indonesia in ASEAN in 1995, the fear is still obvious as state-sponsored historians downplay historical and cultural connections between Champa and the Malay/Islamic world.

After the 1976 establishment of the Socialist Republic of Vietnam, some of the 55,000 Cham Muslims emigrated to Malaysia. 1,750 were also accepted as immigrants by Yemen; most settled in Ta'izz. Those who remained did not suffer violent persecution, although some writers claim that their mosques were closed by the government. In 1981, foreign visitors to Vietnam were still permitted to speak to indigenous Muslims and pray alongside them, and a 1985 account described Ho Chi Minh City's Muslim community as being especially ethnically diverse: aside from Cham people, there were also Indonesians, Malays, Bangladeshis, Pakistanis, Yemenis, Omanis, and North Africans; their total numbers were roughly 10,000 at the time.

Vietnam's second largest mosque was opened in January 2006 in Xuân Lộc, Đồng Nai Province; its construction was partially funded by donations from Saudi Arabia and the United Arab Emirates, the latter has a strong tie to Vietnam. A new mosque, the largest in Vietnam, in An Giang Province, the Kahramanlar Rahmet Mosque, was opened in 2017 with Turkish funds.

According to the Cham advocacy group International Office of Champa (IOC-Champa) and Cham Muslim activist Khaleelah Porome, both Cham Hindu and Muslims have experienced religious and ethnic persecution and restrictions on their faith under the current Vietnamese government, with the Vietnamese state confisticating Cham property and forbidding Cham from observing their religious beliefs. In 2010 and 2013 several incidents occurred in Thành Tín and Phươc Nhơn villages where Cham were murdered by Vietnamese. In 2012, Vietnamese police in Chau Giang village stormed into a Cham Mosque, stole the electric generator. Cham Muslims in the Mekong Delta have also been economically marginalised, with ethnic Vietnamese settling on land previously owned by Cham people with state support. Cham activist Suleiman Idres Bin called for independence of Champa from Vietnam and went as far as comparing its situation to East Timor.

Demographics

Vietnam's April 1999 census showed 63,146 Muslims. Over 77% lived in the South Central Coast, with 34% in Ninh Thuận Province, 24% in Bình Thuận Province, and 9% in Ho Chi Minh City; another 22% lived in the Mekong Delta region, primarily in An Giang Province. Only 1% of Muslims lived in other regions of the country. The number of believers is gender-balanced to within 2% in every area of major concentration except An Giang, where the population of Muslim women is 7.5% larger than the population of Muslim men. This distribution is somewhat changed from that observed in earlier reports. Prior to 1975, almost half of the Muslims in the country lived in the Mekong Delta, and as late as 1985, the Muslim community in Ho Chi Minh City was reported to consist of nearly 10,000 individuals. Of the 54,775 members of the Muslim population over age 5, 13,516, or 25%, were currently attending school, 26,134, or 48%, had attended school in the past, and the remaining 15,121, or 27%, had never attended school, compared to 10% of the general population. This gives Muslims the second-highest rate of school non-attendance out of all religious groups in Vietnam (the highest rate being that for Protestants, at 34%). The school non-attendance rate was 22% for males and 32% for females. Muslims also had one of the lowest rate of university attendance, with less than 1% having attended any institution of higher learning, compared to just under 3% of the general population.

There are two Muslim groups in Vietnam: Sunni Muslims and Bani Cham Muslims. The Bani branch is considered unorthodox because its practices are different from mainstream Islam as it is influenced by Cham folk beliefs. Cham Bani Muslims consisted entirely of ethnic Chams living particularly in the provinces of Ninh Thuận and Bình Thuận. The Bani community numbered around 64,000 and 407 clerics (2006), is organized by the Bani Religious Leaders Council. The Sunni community has a wider in term of ethnicity (Cham, Viet, Malay, Khmer, Chinese, and Arab). Their population in 2006 was 25,000; mostly inhabiting in the southwest of the Mekong Delta, along with urban areas such as Hanoi or Ho Chi Minh City. 

However, there are esoteric non-orthodox Islamic beliefs in the Mekong Delta which are regarded as mê tín (superstitions). Cham researcher Dohamide conjectures these non-Islamic beliefs among the Mekong Delta Cham as Sufism. He believes that some fragments of the Mekong Delta Cham communities may be perhaps strongly influenced by Sufi orders.

Official representation
The Ho Chi Minh City Muslim Representative Committee was founded in 1991 with seven members; a similar body was formed in An Giang Province in 2004.

Cultural appreciation
Though the Muslim community counted only just 1% of Vietnamese population as a whole and has been suffering under communist oppression, the Vietnamese regard the Muslim community with a favorable opinion due to its tolerance approach. It's notable that religious worshipping locations, whenever located, can be found easily and get less harassment despite the communist's atheist policy. Ho Chi Minh City already has five major mosques and a Muslim district.

The Cham Muslim Identity in the Mekong Delta 
There are two main groups of Chams practicing the Islamic faith in Vietnam: one in Central Vietnam in the Ninh Thuan and Binh Thuan provinces corresponding to the territories of the ancient Champa kingdom, commonly referred to as the Cham Bani, and another in the southern Mekong Delta, with the latter population being around 64,000. The Cham Muslims of the Mekong Delta reside around the area of Châu Đốc in An Giang Province close to the Cambodian border, and also in Ho Chi Minh City and the provinces of Đồng Nai and Tây Ninh, practicing the Sunni Muslim faith. The Cham Muslims in Vietnam’s Mekong Delta assert their identity as unconfined by national boundaries, but self-identified as an ethnic community with an emphasis on Islam which enables them to transcend geographical boundaries and establish ties with co-religionists across borders. They are seen to engage in a cosmopolitan livelihood largely dependent on trade with extensive extra-local networks that transcends national boundaries. A comprehensive study done on this Cham group in Southern Vietnam can be seen in Philip Taylor’s book, Cham Muslims of the Mekong Delta: Place and Mobility in the Cosmopolitan Periphery (2007), which explores in detail the Islamic Cham community in southern Vietnam by presenting their socio-cultural and socio-economic history based on extensive field work done in the Mekong Delta from 1999 to 2005 with various interviews conducted with the local Chams in the Vietnamese language.

Origins and Religion

Islam has played a key role in the lives of the Muslim Chams of the Mekong Delta, not only as a religion, but also as a source of origin, a vital unifier in their self-identification as Chams. While some Chams agree with scholarly views of their ancient origins from the kingdom of Champa, many deny such ancestry and state instead a variety of origins in Islam itself, as well as Malaysia and Angkor, Cambodia. While this denial was viewed by scholars as a rejection of displacement and ancestral links to central Vietnam, fear of reprisal from host nations, and silence resulting from a traumatic past of guilt and persecution as in the case of the Cambodian Chams, these pluralistic views might indeed point to the Chams as having diverse origins, which may in turn lie in the cosmopolitan creed of Islam that they have fervently embraced.  

The Chams of the ancient Champa kingdoms along the south-central coast of Vietnam originally practiced Hinduism. Today, the Central Chams of Vietnam consists of two groups: the Balamon Chams, who practice an indigenized form of Hinduism, and the Bani Chams, who practice and indigenized form of Islam. The Islamic faith was introduced to these early Chams with the arrival of two waves of foreign Muslims on their shores: the first being Arabs, Indians, Persians and later Chinese Muslims beginning in the 9th century, and the second being Malay Muslims in the 16th and 17th centuries when maritime trade flourished in Southeast Asia in which Muslim traders played a significant part. Most historians recognized the presence of a “significant Muslim community among the indigenous Cham population” only after the fall of the Vijaya kingdom of Champa in 1471. The Chams have adopted Islam because of their disinclination for “genealogical identification” of these two groups that led the Cham Muslims to move south. 

For the Chams of the Delta, Islam’s appeal lies in its universality and its ability to overcome various barriers of daily life with a unifying relatability to overcome barriers of linguistic diversities and differing origins resulting from pluralistic migration as experienced by these Chams, which drew them to adopt this faith. Scholars had also emphasized Islam as a means of reconsolidating displaced peoples, a result of missionary work, and as a transcendence creed more suitable to these Chams’ mobile lifestyles engaging in extra-local trade. Traditional animism, in which local spirits are worshipped to seek their protection, would not work for the southern Chams’ situation, whose livelihoods involve constant movement and/or migration where they would find themselves outside the protective sphere of their initial guardian spirits, whereas the God of monotheistic religions such as Islam provides universal protection to all those in His faith.  In addition, the Islamic faith provides the trader with a “set of ethics applied to business practice and a disciplining code of conduct” that renders it more acceptable and appealing as compared to traditional spirit worship. 

Islam also provides a means of providing access to a wider world of co-religionists, evidenced by the Chams’ connections and affinity to Malaysia and the Middle Eastern world.  As such, emphasis has been increasingly placed by the Southern Chams on their Malay origins and migration, which may possibly be a result of the growing prosperity of Malaysia, its influence, and its interest in the “Malay Chams” in recent years where the Chams have been considered as part of a wider Malay world. In this regard, the Chams are seen to use their ethnicity and “their linguistic, cultural, and historical affinities” with neighboring countries to further their socio-economic interests. The Chams also employ such affinities, “perceptions of oppression”, and their “Muslimness” in their interactions and negotiations with not only the Malays but with the Khmer as well. In this respect, the Chams of the Mekong Delta have also enjoyed close kinship ties to the Chams in Cambodia, sharing a common religion, language, and trade links that has spanned many generations. Furthermore, resistance to their ethnic minority status and the Vietnamese State’s attempts at assimilation, and their extensive history of interactions with transnational cultural forces have also rendered the Muslim Chams conducive to socio-cultural inclinations towards the larger Malay society. In this regard, Islam is also seen to have revitalized and preserved their ethnic cultural identity through access to better job opportunities and Islamic higher education in the larger Malay/Islamic world, and through assistance provided for the building of mosques in their communities that serve as vital landmarks of Cham localities and bulwarks of their religious culture. The Cham Muslim society can thus be considered as fluid and adaptive, where boundaries are constantly negotiated and transcended in attempts to reinforce and preserve their ethnic identity. 

The Chams regard themselves as among the earlier settlers to the Mekong Delta region, as opposed to state narratives of Vietnamese majorities’ expansion to the South. Historical French, Vietnamese, and Cham sources studied by Weber (2011) gave a vivid account of Cham and Malay military colonies created in the 18th century in Vietnam’s southwestern provinces. The Chams and Malays from Cambodia were migrated or displaced to the Tay Ninh and Chau Doc areas by the Vietnamese in order to establish Viet-controlled settlements for frontier defense.  Attempts were made by the French after the dismantlement of the settlements to isolate these non-Viet and Vietnamese communities, which resulted in tensions arising between them. This sheds considerable light on the migratory cycle of the Chams over the centuries into and out of Cambodia that Taylor (2007) alluded to, and the tensions that still exist today between the various ethnic groups of the Mekong Delta, providing an alternative view of the Chams as the “later arrivals”.

The Cham Economic Life

The Cham Muslim communities in the Mekong Delta have generally been viewed as “poor” and “backward”, residing in remote areas, isolated physically from the economic centers of the country amidst a web of waterways, and socially from their neighbors resulting from a strict observance of their religious practices, engaging in a “subsistence-oriented” localist economy. Their relatively low education levels and minimal participation in the modern market economy as compared to the other ethnic groups, have been thought to have contributed to their economic situation. Their religious traditions paradoxically have been regarded to have both hindered and assisted their engagement in trade. The economic reforms of the state and open-door market policies of the state were not able to achieve much in alleviating the Cham’s economic standing but instead have further marginalized them.  They were unable to participate in rice export and in large-scale rice farming due to the falling prices of rice and to land being lost following the state’s land redistribution policies of the 1970s; unable to engage in the emerging aquaculture business of fish-rearing due to lack of capital; and unable to continue the traditional weaving industry due to its inability to compete with cheaper, mass produced fabric made available by the market. As such the mainstay of Cham economy became trade. 

Given their settlements’ geolocation, the Chams have for generations engaged in trade across the Cambodia-Viet border and in trans-local trade across the Mekong Delta as far away as Central and North Vietnam, especially to places unreached by the modern market, utilising their multilinguistic abilities and territorial knowledge, with many being able to speak Vietnamese, the national lingua franca, Khmer, and Malay, in addition to the Cham language. This nature of the Chams points instead to their cosmopolitan nature, rather than to the commonly held idea of ethnic minorities as being isolated due to the remote situation of their communities.  Despite this cosmopolitan nature, the economic difficulties faced by the Chams mentioned above ironically goes against state narratives of economic liberation enjoyed under to its open market policies.  The Chams are seen to regard themselves as a disenfranchised group, whereas the majority Kinh were regarded to be endowed with better access to the state. The Chams’ continuous mobility and their outward migration to the cities and overseas for higher education and better job opportunities on the other hand have resulted in political agency for the Chams, resulting in remittances that benefit the local communities and reduced frictions with other ethnic groups.

The Cultural Dimension

The matrilineal traditions practiced by the Central Chams of Vietnam can no longer be seen among the Chams of the Mekong Delta. However, certain kinship practices are still found to be shared among the two groups, such as monogamy and the post-marital matrilocal practice in which the man moves in with his bride’s family following his marriage. The two groups also share a common Malayo-Polynesian Cham language that is mutually understandable, although differences in pronunciation and accent exist. However, the written Cham script derived from Sanskrit known as the akhar thrah, while still being maintained by the Central Chams in both its writing system and texts, has been lost among the Chams of the Mekong Delta. This causes the Central Chams to render their southern counterparts as having “lost their Cham culture”. However, the Chams of the Delta do not regard this as a lack on their part, where the Arabic alphabet is used instead for the written form of the Cham language. In addition, Malay and Arabic are also learnt by many especially for Koranic studies. In the realm of religion however, the Chams of the Delta regard themselves as practicing a “purer form” of Islam as compared to the Cham Banis in the north who also worship ancestors and whose religious practices are seen to have Bramanic influences. 

The Chams have been depicted in state cultural narratives as part of the cultural mosaic of ethnic minorities that constitute the state of Vietnam, and have resisted such monolithic views of their culture. In the views of the Cham Muslims of the Mekong Delta, the state is seen to regard the Central Cham culture as encompassing of all Chams and tend to highlight it as the minority ethnic Cham culture with little regard of diversity within the Cham groups such as theirs, thus raising tensions among the Cham Muslims. The state’s reach to this southern delta region has been limited and contested, and where the state’s portrayal of Cham culture as matrilineal and unchanging, does not conform with the fluid social and ideological exchanges that take place within the Cham Muslim communities of the Delta. 

In this regard, a view that supports the notion of self-identification among the Chams and challenges the dominant narrative of the Chams as a minority bounded by nation-state frameworks is to be noted. Photographic portrayals of Chams residing in Vietnam, Malaysia, and Hainan, China, not only in traditional settings performing cultural rituals or as modern professionals performing daily duties in their everyday lives, have been depicted as being themselves in their home environments.  This portrays an aspect of the Chams differing from the common “folkloric depictions” of them as a “colourful and timeless” ethnic minority of a nation state. As such, “an alternative approach to belonging” is seen among the Chams where modern representations of the Cham reject ethnic objectification associated with the notion of backwardness. It is seen as such that “self-identification” as the best unifier of Chams across Vietnam, resisting common categorizations and portrayals of Cham ethnicity, where besides the common Cham language, little unites the Chams, especially given that not all Chams relate to ancestral origin narratives associated with the ancient Champa kingdom.

Cham Potency

Beliefs among the non-Cham Vietnamese population prevail of Cham potency through spiritual and occult powers, drawing continuity from the ancient Champa animistic and local spirit worship. The belief in Cham spiritual potency has thus added another dimension to the perceived identity of this ethnic group by non-Chams in Vietnam. The Vietnamese regard of Cham potency to the latter’s perceived power and knowledge derived from their “privileged connection to the local area”, and as imagined “weapons to overcome the deficits” of displacement, impoverishment, and disadvantage that they had suffered. The belief and worship in potent Cham spiritual figures and their origins in the Mekong Delta reveal aspects of being Cham- where fame and repute are derived from being trans-local and mobile, achieved through trade, religious studies, and pilgrimage, with a sense of “simultaneous belonging to local, trans-local and universal communities of faith”, drawing a parallel to the sacred journeys undertaken to Mecca and the locale’s perceived magical potency.  

The Cham female spirits are venerated as the protectors of their respective localities, following the establishment of such cults by the Viet emperors who claimed of having been “assisted” by the spirits in their victories over Cham territories, and thus by co-opting Cham cultural elements into their territorial expansion, created a legitimacy narrative over the conquered Cham lands. By establishing “historical potency” and continuity, the Vietnamese engage in “remembering” the Chams as the first occupiers of the land. Through such “remembering”, a form of cultural “compensation” is considered to be rendered towards the Chams. In this regard, ideological complexities are observed in the worship of the “Lady of the Realm” of the Mekong Delta in which the multi-ethnic historical layers that undergird this region is reflected.  The “Lady” ‘’Ba Chau Xu’’ and her shrine in Chau Doc near the Cambodian border functions as a “boundary-marker”, whose legends in the official accounts relates to how she assisted the mandarin ‘’Thoai Ngoc Hau’’ in his efforts towards defending Vietnamese territories, co-opting the goddess into the Vietnamese pantheon and national defense narratives whereas the aspect of Vietnamese expansion into previous Khmer territories had been reversed, especially given archaeologic attributes of the statue to be a female likeness made over that of Shiva of Khmer origin. Some locals believe the “Lady” to actually be the Cham goddess ‘’Thien Y A Na’’ or even of Indian origins, although in current times, it is increasingly being venerated by the local ethnic Chinese for her efficacy in fertility and business prosperity. 

In this vein, a revival of ethnic spirit rituals in the post-Doi Moi era is seen to have taken place in Vietnam, where Daoist-inspired practices in which ethnic minorities are regarded as “contemporary ancestors” of the Vietnamese people, whose tutelary spirits safeguard their respective lands, had overtaken earlier neo-Confucian views of minorities being regarded as the “junior siblings” of the majority Vietnamese with notions of ethnic minorities as “mired in the past”.

Conclusion 

The Cham Muslims in the Mekong Delta of Vietnam have long established a community for themselves centred on the Islamic religion and a way of life defined by Islamic values. The scholarship on Cham ethnicity discussed above portrays how despite pluralistic accounts of origin and linguistic diversity, the Chams’ self-identification as Muslims unifies the Chams not only across the Delta but also across national boundaries.  State narratives of isolation and remoteness in relation to geographical situations of ethnic minorities are in paradox for the Chams of the Delta where cross-border networks of engagement, extra-local trade and religious connections attest instead to their cosmopolitanism. Assistance from the Cham Muslim diaspora across the globe, urban emigrations, followed by state efforts at infrastructure development have also enabled them to exercise political agency as seen in higher education levels among the young, livelihoods bolstered by relatives’ remittances. The Chams have also been able to utilise their religion in seeking support and recognition across co-regionalists in their pursuit of education and better opportunities beyond their localities which have contributed to the preservation of their identity and culture. The works of Taylor and other contemporary scholars as studied above portray the various means of Cham resistance to state assimilation efforts and to an ethnic minority status bounded by nation-state ideologies and categorisations that re-affirm self-identification as a unifying element, where despite the existence of traditional ritualistic beliefs, Islamic faith and cultural values bind the Muslim Chams of the Mekong Delta.

See also
 Religion in Vietnam
 Islam by country

References

Notes

Sources

Census tables

 
Vietnam